Delbert Kirsch is a Canadian provincial politician, who serves as the current Member of the Legislative Assembly of Saskatchewan for the constituency of Batoche. He is a member of the Saskatchewan Party, and was first elected in 2003 with the creation of the electoral district of Batoche.

Electoral history

2020 Saskatchewan general election

2016 Saskatchewan general election

2011 Saskatchewan general election

2007 Saskatchewan general election

2003 Saskatchewan general election

References

External links
 Delbert Kirsch profile at Legislative Assembly of Saskatchewan

Year of birth missing (living people)
Farmers from Saskatchewan
Living people
Saskatchewan Party MLAs
21st-century Canadian politicians
Canadian auctioneers